Prunus murrayana, called the Murray's plum, is a critically endangered shrub native to Texas. It is found in the Edwards Plateau and the trans-Pecos regions of the state.

Prunus murrayana is a thorny, deciduous shrub up to 5 meters (almost 17 feet) tall, forming clumps by means of sprouts formed at the base of the plant. The leaves are hairy on both surfaces, usually folding along the midrib. The flowers are white, usually appearing about the same time as the leaves. The fruits are red with white dots, hairless but with a waxy coating on the outside. It is purportedly so rare that no one has seen its fruit since first being scientifically described.

References

External links

Flora of Texas
Plants described in 1929
murrayana
murrayana